Jowe Head (born Stephen Bird) is a British guitarist, singer, and visual artist, who was a member of Swell Maps before joining the Television Personalities. He has also released a large amount of material as a solo artist and as leader of groups such as Househunters and Palookas.

Biography
Jowe Head (the stage name derived from Birmingham slang for "weirdo") was born Stephen John Bird in 1956 in Kidderminster, Worcestershire, and moved to Solihull at an early age. He started playing in 1973 with Nikki Sudden, Epic Soundtracks and Phones Sportsman in a loose collective that later became known as Swell Maps.  He also played with Epic Soundtracks and Ken Spiers (later better known as Spizz) in another local band. With Swell Maps he recorded numerous singles (some under the guise of the Phones Sportsman Band and also backing The Cult Figures) and two albums, before the band split up in 1980.

He then embarked on a solo career, releasing his debut album, Pincer Movement, in 1982. In the mid-1980s he formed a new band, The Palookas, which ran in parallel to his other projects until 1989, and joined the Television Personalities in 1983, staying with the band for the next ten years. His second solo album, Strawberry Deutschmark, was issued in February 1986, featuring contributions from two of his former-Swell Maps colleagues, and singer Carmel. He then led a new band, The Househunters, releasing three singles and an album, Feeding Frenzy, between 1986 and 1988, before again recording as a solo artist. The Jowe Head Personal Organizer was released in 1988. A collection of his work, Unhinged, was issued by Overground Records in 1994. After playing bass in Long Decline, he formed Angel Racing Food.

In 2008 he formed Jowe Head and the Demi-Monde, releasing three albums on Topplers Records, with a line-up including Lee McFadden, Catherine Gerbrands, Jeff Bloom, Marina Young and Jane Ruby. Contributing artists include Phil Martin, Chloe Herrington, Kate Newell and Heath Stanley.  By 2012, the line-up consisted of Jowe and Catherine with Tim Bowen on cello and Ravi Low-Beer on drums.

Following the demise of The Demi-Monde in 2015, Jowe now has three projects:  Infernal Contraption is a development from Demi-Monde, featuring Catherine and Ravi, plus Cos Chapman (of Rude Mechanicals) and Lee McFadden (of Cult Figures).  He also has a duo called Eleventh Hour Adventists, with Jasmine Pender (of Rotten Bliss).  He also currently plays synthesiser and various self built devices with Rude Mechanicals and contributes songs to their repertoire.

Discography
See also Swell Maps and Television Personalities.

Jowe Head

Albums
Pincer Movement (1982), Hedonics
Strawberry Deutschmark (1986), Constrictor
The Jowe Head Personal Organizer (1988), Hollow Planet
Unhinged (1994), Overground
"From a Parallel Universe"  (2006) Topplers
"Cabinet of Curios"  (2017) Munster (double LP compilation)

Singles
"Sudden Shower" (1988), Hollow Planet
The Legendary EP (1991), Small

Compilations
"Classical Music" (1989), Constrictor
"Falling Uphill" (2004), Windless Air Music

The Long Decline

Albums
"Decomposure" (2006), Sniffin' Glue Records

Househunters

Albums
Feeding Frenzy (1988), Hollow Planet

Singles
"Cuticles" (1986), 53rd & 3rd
"Cooler Than Thou" (1988), 53rd & 3rd
"Warp Factor 13" (1988), Hollow Planet

Palookas

Albums
Gift (1986), Constrictor
Dump (1987), Constrictor
Hit The Bottle (1988), Constrictor
"Schmalookas" (1991), Historia
Rectify(2012)available on downloads

Singles
"Clear Day" (1985), Prophet
"I Want to Be Free" (1987), Constrictor
"Run Rabbit" (1987), Hollow Planet

Angel Racing Food

Albums
Angel Racing Food (2009), Topplers

Singles
"Venus Bigfoot" (2003), Little Teddy Recordings

Jowe Head and the Demi-Monde
"Diabolical Liberties" (2010), Topplers
"Tales from a Twisted Tower" (2013), Topplers
"Visionaries"  (2015), Topplers

References

External links

Jowe Head at televisionpersonalities.co.uk
Jowe Head interview, trakmarx.com
Jowe Head discussing his paintings
Rude Mechanicals one of his current projects

English bass guitarists
English male guitarists
Male bass guitarists
People from Kidderminster
People from Solihull
1956 births
Living people